Ghughua Fossil Park is a National Park, located near Shahpura in Madhya Pradesh, India, in which plant fossils belonging to 31 genera of 18 families have been identified.

The site was founded during the 1970s by Dr. Dharmendra Prasad, a statistical officer of the Mandla district and honorary secretary of the district archaeology unit. It was declared a National Park in 1983. Numerous plant, leaf, fruit, seed, and shell fossils can be found in this park, some of which date as far back as 65 million years, the most prominent of which are the palm fossils.

Notable fossils 
A eucalyptus fossil found at Ghughua is the oldest fossil of its type ever discovered and this find supports its origins from Gondwana. Additional notable discoveries include a dinosaur egg fossil.

Transportation
Ghughua Fossil Park is located near National Highway 11. It is situated 14 km from Shahpura and 76 km from Jabalpur.

See also
Shivalik Fossil Park
National Fossil Wood Park, Tiruvakkarai

References

National parks in Madhya Pradesh
Cretaceous paleontological sites of Asia
Fossil parks in India
Paleontology in India
Dindori district
1983 establishments in Madhya Pradesh
Protected areas established in 1983
National parks of India